Mongolia (Mongolian: , transcription: , Traditional Mongolian:  ,) is a landlocked country in East Asia. Its area is roughly equivalent with the historical territory of Outer Mongolia, which is sometimes used to refer to the current state. It is situated between Russia to the north and China to the south, where it neighbours the Inner Mongolia Autonomous Region. Mongolia does not share a border with Kazakhstan, although only  separate them.

This is a list of individuals and events related to Mongolia in 2021.

Incumbents

Establishments

Disestablishments

Events

Ongoing
 COVID-19 pandemic in Mongolia

January 
2021 Khövsgöl earthquake

February

March

April
April 16 - The Constitutional Court of Mongolia ruled that some elements in the Law on Presidential Elections are unconstitutional, effectively ruling that President Battulga is ineligible to run for reelection.
April 18 - Mongolian President Battulga Khaltmaa issued a decree dissolving the Mongolian People’s Party.
April 30 - Mongolian Parliament officially adopts a decree to provide protection on human rights defenders. According to United Nations OHCHR, Mongolia is the first country in Asia to adopt such measure, giving hopes on further commitment on human rights in Mongolia and the region.

May

June

July

August

September

October

November

December

Deaths

See also
 Outline of Mongolia
 Index of Mongolia-related articles
 List of Mongolia-related topics
 History of Mongolia

References

Notes

Citations

Further reading
 
 

 
2020s in Mongolia
Years of the 21st century in Mongolia
Mongolia
Mongolia